Great North Tigers is a Botswana football club that participates in the country's Botswana First Division North and is affiliate of Botswana Football Association.

Club officials
Sports
Coach: Seth Thazah Moleofi
Assistant coach: Edward Leposo
Assistant coach: Bakanoki Maseko

2008/2009 First team squad

Football clubs in Botswana
Football clubs in Francistown